Dinnage is a surname. Notable people with the surname include:

 Jessica Dinnage (born 1993), Danish actress
 Rosemary Dinnage (1928–2015), British author and critic
 Susanna Dinnage (born 1966/67), British businesswoman

See also
 Dinenage